Alexander Dyakonov (born 1979) is a Russian mathematician, Professor, Dr.Sc., a professor at the Faculty of Computer Science at the Moscow State University. Professor of the Russian Academy of Sciences. Multiple winner of international competitions in applied data analysis.

He defended the thesis «Algebraic closures of the generalized model of recognition algorithms based on the calculation of estimates» for the degree of Doctor of Physical and Mathematical Sciences (2010).

Author of two books and more than 50 scientific articles.

References

Bibliography

External links
 Annals of the Moscow University
 Resolution of the Presidium of the RAS
 MSU CMC
 Scientific works of Alexander Dyakonov
 Scientific works of Alexander Dyakonov

Russian computer scientists
Russian mathematicians
Living people
Academic staff of Moscow State University
1979 births
Moscow State University alumni